Fred André (31 May 1941 – 24 January 2017) was a Dutch footballer. He played as a centre-back at club level from the early-1960s to the late-1970s. He was best known for playing for Telstar from 1963 to 1976, making 328 appearances for the club. He also played for Volendam. He later managed Telstar from 1983 to 1987.

André died on 24 January 2017 at the age of 75.

References

1941 births
2017 deaths
Footballers from Haarlem
Association football defenders
Dutch footballers
Dutch football managers
FC Volendam players
SC Telstar players
SC Telstar managers